The following outline is provided as an overview of and topical guide to the Byzantine Empire:

Byzantine Empire (or Byzantium) – the Constantinople-centred Roman Empire of the Middle Ages. It is also referred to as the Eastern Roman Empire, primarily in the context of Late Antiquity, while the Roman Empire was still administered with separate eastern and western political centres.  In its own time, there was no such thing as "the Byzantine Empire," there was just the ongoing Roman Empire; "Byzantine Empire" is a scholarly term of convenience to differentiate the empire from its earlier existence during classical antiquity before the western half collapsed (see decline of the Roman Empire).  Its citizens continued to refer to their empire as the Roman Empire (Basileia Rhōmaiōn) or Romania. After the Western Roman Empire fragmented and collapsed in  the 5th century, the eastern half continued to thrive, existing for an additional thousand years until it fell to the Ottoman Turks in 1453. During much of its existence, the empire was the most powerful economic, cultural, and military force in Europe.

Geography of the Byzantine Empire

Regions of the Byzantine Empire 
 Albania under the Byzantine Empire
 Byzantine Armenia
 Byzantine Crete
 Byzantine Egypt
 Byzantine Greece

Administrative divisions of the Byzantine Empire 
 Subdivisions of the Byzantine Empire

Provinces of the Byzantine Empire 
 Bithynia
 Byzacena
 Byzantine Crete
 Catepanate of Italy
 Catepanate of Serbia
 Drougoubiteia
 Duchy of Perugia
 Duchy of Rome
 Duchy of the Pentapolis
 Duchy of Venetia
 Egypt (Roman province)
 Europa (Roman province)
 Duchy of Gaeta
 Galatia (Roman province)
 Haemimontus
 Helenopontus
 Honorias
 Isauria
 Mauretania Caesariensis
 Mauretania Tingitana
 Mesopotamia (Roman province)
 Moesia Secunda
 Duchy of Naples
 Palaestina Prima
 Paphlagonia
 Paristrion
 Phrygia Pacatiana
 Phrygia Salutaris
 Pontus Polemoniacus
 Rhodope (Roman province)
 Scythia Minor
 Spania
 Theodorias (province)
 Thessaly

Themes of the Byzantine Empire 
 Theme (Byzantine district)

Cities of the Byzantine Empire 
 Constantinople (capital)
 Thessalonika

Affiliated polities 
 Republic of Venice
 Frankokratia
 Despotate of Epirus
 Empire of Trebizond
 Bulgarian Empire
 Serbian Empire

Demography of the Byzantine Empire 
 Population of the Byzantine Empire

Government and politics of the Byzantine Empire 
 Byzantine emperors
 Byzantine emperors family tree
 Byzantine bureaucracy
 Byzantinism
 Byzantine diplomacy

Political institutions of the Byzantine Empire 

Political institutions of the Byzantine Empire
 Byzantine Senate

Byzantine law 

Byzantine law

Military of the Byzantine Empire 

Military of the Byzantine Empire
 Byzantine battle tactics
 Byzantine military manuals

Byzantine armed forces 
 Byzantine army
 Navy

Military conflicts 
 Byzantine wars

General history of the Byzantine Empire 

History of the Byzantine Empire
 Byzantine civilisation in the twelfth century
 Byzantine Empire under the Amorian dynasty
 Byzantine Empire under the Angelos dynasty
 Byzantine Empire under the Doukas dynasty
 Byzantine Empire under the Heraclian dynasty
 Byzantine Empire under the Isaurian dynasty
 Byzantine Empire under the Komnenos dynasty
 Byzantine Empire under the Leonid dynasty
 Byzantine Empire under the Macedonian dynasty
 Byzantine Empire under the Nikephorian dynasty
 Byzantine Empire under the Palaiologos dynasty
 Byzantine Empire under the Theodosian dynasty
 Byzantine Iconoclasm
 History of Lebanon under Byzantine rule
 History of the Jews in the Byzantine Empire
 Decline of the Byzantine Empire
 Fall of Constantinople

Military history of the Byzantine Empire 
 List of Byzantine wars
 List of sieges of Constantinople
 Byzantine–Sassanid Wars
 Byzantine–Sassanid War of 602–628
 Byzantine–Arab Wars
 Byzantine–Arab Wars (780–1180)
 Sack of Amorium (838)
 Rus'–Byzantine Treaty
 Rus'–Byzantine Treaty (907)
 Rus'–Byzantine Treaty (911)
 Rus'–Byzantine Treaty (945)
 Rus'–Byzantine War
 Rus'–Byzantine War (860)
 Rus'–Byzantine War (907)
 Rus'–Byzantine War (941)
 Rus'–Byzantine War (1024)
 Rus'–Byzantine War (1043)
 Byzantine–Venetian Treaty of 1082
 Byzantine–Venetian War (1294–1302)
 Byzantine civil war of 1321–1328
 Byzantine civil war of 1341–1347
 Byzantine civil war of 1373–1379
 Byzantine–Genoese War (1348–1349)
 Byzantine–Bulgarian Wars
Byzantine conquest of Bulgaria
 Byzantine–Norman wars
 Byzantine–Seljuq Wars
 Byzantine–Georgian wars
 Byzantine–Mongol alliance
 Byzantine–Ottoman Wars

Byzantine historiography 

 Byzantine studies

Works on Byzantine history

Culture of the Byzantine Empire 

Byzantine culture
 Byzantine architecture 
 Byzantine art 
 Macedonian art
 Byzantine dance
 Byzantine literature 
Acritic songs 
Byzantine novel
 Byzantine music
 Byzantine calendar 
 Byzantine cuisine
 Byzantine dress
 Byzantine gardens
 Byzantine Greeks
 Byzantine philosophy

Religion in the Byzantine Empire 
 History of late ancient Christianity
 State church of the Roman Empire
 Byzantine Papacy
 Eastern Orthodox Church
 Byzantine Rite
 Icons
 Byzantine Iconoclasm
 Degrees of Orthodox monasticism
 Mount Athos
 Saint Catherine's Monastery
 Paulicianism

Byzantine language 

Medieval Greek

Byzantine economy 
 Byzantine economy
 Byzantine agriculture
 Byzantine currency
 Byzantine coinage
 Byzantine mints
 Byzantine silk
 Slavery in the Byzantine Empire

Byzantine education 
 Byzantine university
University of Constantinople
 Byzantine rhetoric

Byzantine science and technology 
 Byzantine science
 Byzantine medicine
 List of Byzantine inventions

See also 

 Outline of classical studies
 Agnes of France, Byzantine Empress
 Albanian Greek Catholic Church
 Alexander (Byzantine emperor)
 Argyros (Byzantine family)
 Bandon (Byzantine Empire)
 Book of Job in Byzantine illuminated manuscripts
 Bristol Byzantine
 Byzantine & Christian Museum
 Byzantine Catholic World
 Byzantine Chain
 Byzantine Church, Lin
 Byzantine Discalced Carmelites
 Byzantine Fresco Chapel
 Byzantine Institute of America
 Byzantine Master of the Crucifix of Pisa
 Byzantine Museum of Antivouniotissa
 Byzantine Museum of Ioannina
 Byzantine Museum of Kastoria
 Byzantine Revival architecture
 Byzantine Rite Christianity in Canada
 Byzantine Rite Lutheranism
 Byzantine and Modern Greek Studies
 Byzantine and Post-Byzantine Collection of Chania
 Byzantine commonwealth
 Byzantine fault tolerance
 Byzantine heraldry
 Byzantine lyra
 Byzantine text-type
 Cathedral of St. Mary Byzantine Catholic Church
 Chios Byzantine Museum
 Constantine III (Byzantine emperor)
 Cours (Byzantine general)
 Early Byzantine mosaics in the Middle East
 Eastern (Byzantine) Catholic Martyrology for February
 Eastern (Byzantine) Catholic Martyrology for January
 Georgian Byzantine-Rite Catholics
 Greek Byzantine Catholic Church
 Holy Ghost Byzantine Catholic Church (Pittsburgh)
 Immortals (Byzantine)
 Index of Byzantine Empire-related articles
 Irene Palaiologina (Byzantine empress)
 John the Deacon (Byzantine writer)
 Julian Byzantine
 Kephale (Byzantine Empire)
 Kleisoura (Byzantine district)
 Komnenian Byzantine army
 List of Byzantine foreign treaties
 List of Byzantine monuments in Istanbul
 List of Byzantine revolts and civil wars
 List of Byzantine scholars
 List of Byzantine usurpers
 List of Roman and Byzantine Empresses
 List of exiled and pretending Byzantine Empresses
 List of leaders during the Byzantine Papacy
 Museum of Ancient Greek, Byzantine and Post-Byzantine Musical Instruments
 Museum of Byzantine Culture
 Neo-Byzantine architecture in the Russian Empire
 Norman-Arab-Byzantine culture
 Palaiologan Byzantine army
 Pannonia, Byzantine Empire
 Papias (Byzantine office)
 Phokas (Byzantine family)
 Political mutilation in Byzantine culture
 Prosopography of the Byzantine World
 Quantum Byzantine agreement
 Raoul (Byzantine family)
 Saint Anne Catholic Church of the Byzantine Rite
 Serbo-Byzantine architecture
 St. John Chrysostom Byzantine Catholic Church (Pittsburgh)
 St. John the Baptist Byzantine Catholic Cathedral (Pittsburgh)
 St. John the Baptist Byzantine Catholic Cemetery
 St. Michael Byzantine Catholic Church Toledo
 St. Nicholas Byzantine Catholic Church

References

External links 

 Byzantine studies, resources and bibliography
 Adena, L. "The Enduring Legacy of Byzantium ", Clio History Journal, 2008.
 Ciesniewski, C. "The Byzantine Achievement", Clio History Journal, 2006.
 Fox, Clinton R. What, If Anything, Is a Byzantine? (Online Encyclopedia of Roman Emperors)
 The Cambridge Medieval History (IV) The Eastern Roman Empire (717–1453).
 Byzantine studies homepage at Dumbarton Oaks. Includes links to numerous electronic texts.
 Byzantium: Byzantine studies on the Internet. Links to various online resources.
 Translations from Byzantine Sources: The Imperial Centuries, c. 700–1204. Online sourcebook.
 De Re Militari. Resources for medieval history, including numerous translated sources on the Byzantine wars.
 Medieval Sourcebook: Byzantium. Numerous primary sources on Byzantine history.
 Bibliography on Byzantine Material Culture and Daily Life. Hosted by the University of Vienna; in English.
 Constantinople Home Page. Links to texts, images and videos on Byzantium.
 Byzantium in Crimea: Political History, Art and Culture.
 Institute for Byzantine Studies of the Austrian Academy of Sciences (with further resources and a repository with papers on various aspects of the Byzantine Empire)

 Miscellaneous
 
 De Imperatoribus Romanis. Scholarly biographies of many Byzantine emperors.
 The Fall of the Empire. Byzantine Lesson (2007). (Russian: Гибель империи. Византийский урок) A film explaining the political and economical reasons for the fall of the Empire, filmed by the Russian Orthodox Church.
 12 Byzantine Rulers by Lars Brownworth of The Stony Brook School; audio lectures. NYTimes review.
 18 centuries of Roman Empire by Howard Wiseman (Maps of the Roman/Byzantine Empire throughout its lifetime)

 1
 
Outlines of geography and places
Wikipedia outlines